Hidden Dreams is a 2021 Cameroonian drama film directed by Ngang Romanus. It was selected as the Cameroonian entry for the Best International Feature Film at the 94th Academy Awards.

Cast
 Nchini Sylvia-Bright as Njang
 Eystein Young Dingha Junior as Verbe
 Syriette Che as Philo
 Otia Vitali as Fon
 Nchini Justin
 Libota McDonald
 Vugah Samuel as Bobe

See also
 List of submissions to the 94th Academy Awards for Best International Feature Film
 List of Cameroonian submissions for the Academy Award for Best International Feature Film

References

External links
 

2021 films
2021 drama films
Cameroonian drama films
English-language Cameroonian films
2020s French-language films
2020s English-language films
2021 multilingual films